Pennagaram is a town in Dharmapuri district in the Indian state of Tamil Nadu. It is the headquarters of Pennagaram taluk (sub-district).

Geography
It has an average elevation of 493 metres (1617 feet).
The famous tourist place Hogenakkal Falls, is 15 km from Pennagaram.
Crocodile farm is available in Hogenakkal.

Demographics
 India census, Pennagaram had a population of 18,100. Males constitute 52% of the population and females 48%. Pennagaram has an average literacy rate of 60%, higher than the national average of 59.5%: male literacy is 67%, and female literacy is 52%. In Pennagaram, 13% of the population is under 6 years of age. It is very near (15 km) to Hogenakkal Falls in Pennagaram taluk, which is called India's Niagara.

Administration 
Panchayats are Perumbalai - Semmanur.

Politics
Pennagaram assembly constituency is part of Dharmapuri (Lok Sabha constituency).

Economy 
Agriculture for the primary occupation in the area.

Transport 

RTO office located in Dharmapuri.

Roads

Pennagaram is a connected in three state highways in other district. There is bus service to Chennai, Bangalore, Salem, Erode, Dharmapuri, Pondichery, Krishnagiri, Hosur, Thirupattur, Tiruppur, Ramnagar and district other major cities. State highway 60h connected in Pennagaram-Dharmapuri-Thiruppattur.

Rail

The nearest railway station at Dharmapuri in 30 kilometers from Pennagaram.

Education

 Govt Arts College Pennagaram
 Jayam college of engineering Nallanoor, Pennagaram
 Jayam arts & science college Nallanoor, Pennagaram
 Al-islamiah polytechnic college Rajavoor, Pennagaram
 Meenakshi arts & science college Eriyur, Pennagaram

See also 

 Tiger of Mundachipallam, man-eating tiger which operated around Pennagaram

References

Cities and towns in Dharmapuri district